Guido Buscaglia (born 8 October 1996) is an Argentine swimmer. He competed in the men's 50 metre freestyle event at the 2018 FINA World Swimming Championships (25 m), in Hangzhou, China.

References

External links
 

1996 births
Living people
Argentine male swimmers
Argentine male freestyle swimmers
Place of birth missing (living people)
Pan American Games bronze medalists for Argentina
Pan American Games medalists in swimming
Medalists at the 2019 Pan American Games
Swimmers at the 2019 Pan American Games